UTN or Utn may refer to:

 National Technological University
 University of Tennessee, a public research university in Knoxville, Tennessee
 Untrinilium, an unsynthesized chemical element with atomic number 130 and symbol Utn